The 2015 European Under-19 Rugby Union Championship (Rugby Europe Championship) is the ninth edition of the European Under-19 Rugby Union Championship for Under 19 national teams. It will be held in Lisbon, Portugal from October 25 to November 1.

The tournament serves as Europe's qualifier for the 2016 World Rugby Under 20 Trophy.

Matches

Quarter finals

Semi finals

Cup

Bowl

Play-off games

7th-place game

5th-place game

3rd-place game

Final

Final Rankings and Statistics

References

External links
Rugby Europe official webpage 

European
International rugby union competitions hosted by Portugal
2015–16 in European rugby union
2015–16 in Spanish rugby union
2015–16 in German rugby union
2015–16 in Belgian rugby union
2015 in Russian rugby union
2015 in Dutch sport
2015 in Polish sport
2015 in Portuguese sport